Psaphida damalis is a species of moth of the family Noctuidae first described by Augustus Radcliffe Grote in 1879. It is found in the US state of California.

External links
Images
Genera Lepipolys, Adita and Eutolype

Psaphida
Moths described in 1879